Saeed Khan Nizamani is a Pakistani politician who had been a Member of the Provincial Assembly of Sindh, from May 2013 to May 2018.

Early life and education
He was born on 6 January 1962 in Sanghar.

He has a degree of Bachelor of Science, a degree of Bachelor of Laws and a degree of Master of Arts.

Political career

He was elected to the Provincial Assembly of Sindh as a candidate of Pakistan Muslim League (F) from Constituency PS-78 SANGHAR-I in 2013 Pakistani general election.

References

External links
Saeed Khan Nizamani: Age, Education, Family, Father, Politician, Political Party, Political Career, Constituency, Contact, Facebook, Twitter, Instagram | Content.PK

Living people
Sindh MPAs 2013–2018
1962 births
Pakistan Muslim League (F) politicians